Florimond Guillain (9 February 1903 – 16 June 1993) was a French racing cyclist. He rode in the 1927 Tour de France.

References

1903 births
1993 deaths
French male cyclists
Place of birth missing